Bamidele Jermaine Alli (born 11 April 1996) is an English professional footballer who plays as an attacking midfielder for  club Beşiktaş, on loan from Premier League club Everton.

Born and raised in Milton Keynes, he joined the youth system at Milton Keynes Dons aged 11 and broke into the first team five years later, during the 2012–13 season. Over the next two-and-a-half years he made 88 official appearances for the team, scoring 24 goals. He signed for Tottenham Hotspur in February 2015 for an initial fee of £5 million, being loaned back to the Dons for the remainder of the season. In each of his first two campaigns at White Hart Lane, Alli was voted the PFA Young Player of the Year and made the PFA Team of the Year. He joined Everton in January 2022 and later that year joined Beşiktaş on loan.

Dele played for the England U17, U18 and U19 teams, before making his senior debut in 2015. He was selected for UEFA Euro 2016 and the 2018 FIFA World Cup, scoring in the latter and helping England to the semi-finals.

Club career

Milton Keynes Dons

Early career
Dele joined the youth system at Milton Keynes Dons when he was 11 years old after playing for City Colts. He made his debut for the first team as a sixteen-year-old on 2 November 2012, coming on as a 64th-minute substitute for Jay O'Shea in a 0–0 draw with Southern Football League club Cambridge City in the FA Cup first round at Milton Road. His first touch in professional football was a back-heeled pass. His first goal came in the replay against Cambridge eleven days later, where he scored in a 6–1 win at Stadium MK on his first start. He made his league debut in a 2–3 defeat to Coventry City at home on 29 December, where he played 71 minutes before being replaced by Zeli Ismail. His only other league appearance in the 2012–13 Football League One season, came as a second-half substitute for Patrick Bamford in the last match of the season, a 2–0 win over Stevenage at Broadhall Way.

2013–14 season
The 2013–14 season saw Alli break into the MK Dons first team on a regular basis. He started the Dons' first league match of the season, a 0–0 draw away at Shrewsbury Town. In his first Football League Trophy appearance, Alli scored to help MK Dons beat Northampton Town 2–0 and thus progress to the second round of the tournament. On 28 September, Alli scored his first professional league goal in a 4–1 win against Stevenage. After injury setbacks in late 2013, Alli subsequently established himself as a first-choice player in 2014. He scored the opening goal in the 3–2 win over Shrewsbury Town at Stadium mk on 11 January, with a header from Stephen Gleeson's pinpoint pass. 

On 11 March 2014, against Notts County at Meadow Lane, aged 17 years and 11 months old, Alli scored a hat-trick to guide the Dons to a 3–1 victory. His next and final goal of the 2013–14 season, came on 5 April against Coventry City at the Sixfields Stadium; Alli struck a volley from 25 yards out as MK Dons defeated Coventry 2–1. He made 37 appearances in all competitions during the 2013–14 season, scoring 7 times, with 33 appearances and 6 goals in the league.

2014–15 season

With the departure of Gleeson to Birmingham City in June 2014, Alli became the first-choice central midfield partner to Darren Potter. He started the season brightly, playing the first league match of the season as the Dons overcame a 2–0 deficit to defeat Gillingham, 4–2. He then helped the team to a 3–1 win over arch-enemies, AFC Wimbledon, in the League Cup first round. His first goal of the 2014–15 season came in the first away league match, a 3–2 defeat to Peterborough United, where he scored a tap-in from Will Grigg's deflected shot.

On 26 August, Alli played the full 90 minutes in the League Cup second round as MK Dons recorded a historic 4–0 win over Manchester United. It was reported that numerous scouts from top clubs across Europe attended the match to watch him play, including representatives from Bayern Munich and Liverpool. In the match after the 4–0 League Cup win over Manchester United, Alli continued his rich vein of form with a goal curled in from the edge of the box in a 2–0 win over Crawley Town. After the international break, Alli played 77 minutes in the 5–3 win against Barnsley, assisting the Dons second goal and scoring their third goal himself with a chip over the Barnsley goalkeeper. He was chosen as the Football League Young Player of the Month for August.

On 18 September, Alli extended his contract with MK Dons until June 2017. Two days later, in a match against Crewe Alexandra, he scored a hat-trick and achieved one assist in what turned out to be a 6–1 victory for the Dons. It was the second hat-trick of his career and the first he achieved at home, which also led to him winning the Man of the Match award.

Tottenham Hotspur
On 2 February 2015, Alli signed for Premier League club Tottenham Hotspur in the last hours of the mid-season transfer window on a five-and-a-half-year deal for an initial fee of £5 million.

Loan to Milton Keynes Dons
Following his transfer to Tottenham Hotspur, Alli was immediately loaned back to MK Dons for the remainder of the 2014–15 season. On 19 April, he was chosen as the Young Player of the Year at the Football League Awards. The season ended on 3 May with Milton Keynes Dons promoted automatically to the Championship as runners-up behind Bristol City, after a 5–1 home win over relegated Yeovil Town.

2015–16 season

On 8 August 2015, Alli made his Tottenham debut against Manchester United in the Premier League as a substitute in a 1–0 defeat away at Old Trafford, playing the last 13 minutes in place of Eric Dier. Two weeks later, he scored his first goal for the club after coming on for Christian Eriksen in the 1–1 draw against Leicester City.

On 13 September, Alli made his first start for Tottenham in a 1–0 win against Sunderland at the Stadium of Light. On 2 November, he started and scored the second goal in an eventual 3–1 win over Aston Villa. Six days later he started his first North London Derby alongside fellow England youngster Dier in central midfield, and was awarded Man of the Match in the 1–1 draw between rivals Arsenal and Tottenham. On 5 December 2015, he scored his third goal for Tottenham in the 2015–16 campaign in a 1–1 draw against West Bromwich Albion at The Hawthorns.

Following an impressive start to his Premier League career scoring five goals and making three assists in his first 18 league matches, he was rewarded with a new long-term contract until 2021 on 12 January. Eleven days later he scored a 25-yard volley in a 3–1 win at Crystal Palace; BBC Sport pundit and former Spurs player Garth Crooks wrote "I've seen some glorious goals scored in my time watching football matches but I doubt whether I will see a goal scored with such individual flair, and by a 19-year-old, as Dele Alli's goal at Selhurst Park – it was sheer class". On 13 April, he was named on the six-man shortlist for 2015–16's PFA Young Player of the Year.

On 18 April 2016, Alli scored his first brace for Tottenham in a 0–4 away win at Stoke City, reaching ten goals in his debut Premier League season. He was voted the season's PFA Young Player of the Year on 24 April. On 28 April, Alli was banned by the Football Association for three matches, effectively ending his Premier League season, for an off-the-ball incident against West Bromwich Albion in which he punched midfielder Claudio Yacob in the stomach. He later apologised for the incident on Twitter, stating, "Gutted that my season is over. Shouldn't have reacted like I did. Will learn from this and come back stronger."

2016–17 season

Ahead of the season, Alli changed his kit name to Dele, saying that he had "no connection" to his legal surname due to his separation from his mother. His first goal of the season came in a 4–0 win against Stoke City on 10 September 2016. Four days later, he made his UEFA Champions League debut in a 1–2 loss to AS Monaco at Wembley Stadium. His first Champions League goal came against CSKA Moscow at the same stadium on 7 December 2016. Between 18 December 2016 and 21 January 2017, Alli scored eight goals in six league matches, earning the award of Premier League Player of the Month award for January 2017. This included three consecutive braces against Southampton, Watford and Chelsea.

On 23 February, Alli received his first red card for a dangerous tackle on Brecht Dejaegere in Tottenham's UEFA Europa League draw with K.A.A. Gent which saw Spurs eliminated at the Round of 32 stage of the competition. On 20 April 2017, Alli was again named in the PFA Team of the Year, having been included in the League One selection for 2015 and the Premier League selection in 2016. On 23 April, he was named the PFA Young Player of the Year, the day after scoring in Tottenham's 4–2 FA Cup semi-final loss to rivals Chelsea at Wembley Stadium.

2017–18 season
Alli scored his first goal of the season in the opening game of the 2017–18 season away at Newcastle that finished in a 2–0 win. However, he was criticised for his inconsistency this season, failing to perform as well as the previous season. On 1 April 2018, Alli scored twice in the away fixture against Chelsea, helping Tottenham win 3–1, which was their first win in 28 years at Stamford Bridge.

2018–19 season 
On 11 August 2018, Alli scored his first goal of the season, scoring the winning goal in the opening league match against Newcastle United.

On 26 September, Alli was named as captain for Tottenham's EFL Cup third round tie with Watford. The tie, played at Stadium MK due to delays in the completion of Tottenham's new stadium, marked Alli's return to the home ground of his boyhood club Milton Keynes Dons, and the return to his home town of Milton Keynes for the first time as a Tottenham player. The tie finished 2–2, with Alli scoring both a penalty in normal time and the winning penalty in a deciding penalty shoot-out.

In October 2018, Alli signed a new six-year deal at Tottenham, which would keep him at the club until 2024. He also scored in the 3–1 home win against Chelsea, which was his sixth goal in five games against Chelsea, and the first defeat for Chelsea in the Premier League this season. In January 2019, he was ruled out until March with a hamstring injury.

2019–20 season 
Alli missed the start of the season due to a hamstring injury. He returned to the team in the North London Derby on 1 September 2019, coming on as a substitute. He scored his first goal of the season in the match against Watford, drawing 1–1. In November 2019, Mauricio Pochettino was dismissed by the club to be replaced by José Mourinho. Mourinho played Alli as an attacking player just behind Harry Kane, reverting to his earlier position after playing in a deeper midfield role the previous two years. According to Mourinho, "Dele is not a midfield player". The attacking role gave Alli greater freedom to score, and he scored three goals in his first three games under Mourinho, two of which came in the game against Bournemouth.

In February 2020, Alli posted a video on his Snapchat account in which he appeared to mock an Asian man while joking about the COVID-19 outbreak. The video showed Alli wearing a face mask at Heathrow Airport while waiting for his flight to Dubai, before the camera moved to show a man of Asian appearance before zooming in on a bottle of antiseptic handwash, seemingly suggesting the Asian man in the terminal could be infected with the virus. The video was captioned: "The virus gunna have to be faster than that to catch me." In June 2020, Alli was found guilty of an "aggravated breach" of the FA rule that includes a reference to race, colour, ethnic origin and/or nationality, and was judged to have used an "unacceptable racist stereotype" by the regulatory commission. Alli was suspended in June 2020 for one match by the Football Association, making him ineligible for Tottenham Hotspur's Premier League game at home against Manchester United on 19 June. He was also fined £50,000 and ordered to undertake an education course.

2020–21 season 
In the first half of 2020–21 season, Alli was reportedly out of favour with Mourinho, making few starts in games. Most of his starts in games were in the UEFA Europa League, and he scored his first goal of the season in the Europa League play-off match against Maccabi Haifa on 1 October 2020 to cap a 7–2 win for Tottenham. In the Europa last-32 match against Wolfsberg on 24 February 2021, he scored a notable goal with a bicycle kick, starting a 4–0 rout with two further assists. He made his first start in six months in the Premier League on 4 March, in the match against Fulham that ended in a 1–0 win when his shot at goal was deflected off a defender for an own-goal. He started seven Premier League games this season.

2021–22 season
On 22 August 2021, Alli scored his first goal of the season, scoring the only goal in a 1–0 win against Wolverhampton Wanderers. This was Alli's first Premier League goal since March 2020. He continued to struggle to regain his form. Manager Nuno Espírito Santo tried to bring him back into the squad, which proved short-lived as Nuno was replaced by Antonio Conte in early November. Dele failed to find a role under the new manager, and became a fringe player in Conte's plan for Tottenham. After starting only eight league games (two under Conte) in the 2021–22 campaign, Alli was made available for transfer by Tottenham in the January 2022 window.

Everton
Alli moved to fellow Premier League side Everton on 31 January 2022 on an initial free transfer, which could rise to £40 million if certain performance benchmarks are met. The first £10 million would be due after 20 appearances for Everton. He signed a two-and-a-half-year contract, running until the end of the 2023–24 season. Upon signing for the club, Alli cited the opportunity to work under new manager Frank Lampard as a major reason for joining Everton. He made his debut on 8 February as a late substitute in a 3–1 loss against Newcastle United. He failed to make an impact at Everton, making 11 appearances and only 1 start in the 2021–22 season, and two further appearances in the 2022–23 season. He did not score or register an assist in 13 games.

Loan to Beşiktaş
On 25 August 2022, Alli joined Turkish team Beşiktaş on loan for the remainder of the 2022–23 season with an option to buy for the Turkish club. He scored his first goal in over a year in his second appearance for the club, helping the club win 3–2 against Ankaragücü on 4 September 2022. When Şenol Güneş took over as new head coach on 28 October, he stated that Alli was "below expectations in terms of efficiency," pointing to his struggles for Beşiktaş.

International career
Alli has made several appearances at U17 and U18 levels for England. On 27 August 2014, Alli was called up to the England U19 squad following an impressive start to the campaign. He made his debut for England U19 in the 1–1 draw against Germany U19. In the match, Alli assisted the opening goal feeding a through ball to Bradley Fewster who gave England a 1–0 lead.

In February 2015, it was reported that John Fashanu would try to convince Alli to play for Nigeria. However, on 1 October of that year, he was included in Roy Hodgson's England squad for the final UEFA Euro 2016 qualifying matches against Estonia and Lithuania. He made his debut against the former on 9 October, coming on as a late substitute for Ross Barkley in a 2–0 win.

On 17 November 2015, Alli made his first start for the England senior team, scoring the opening goal from a long range shot to beat Spurs teammate, goalkeeper Hugo Lloris in a 2–0 win against France at Wembley Stadium. He was again named in the starting line-up for England's friendly match against world champions Germany on 26 March 2016. Alli was named man of the match by the BBC Sport as England recovered from 0–2 down to win 3–2 at the Berlin Olympiastadion.

Alli was selected for the 23-man England squad for the 2018 FIFA World Cup. On 7 July, Alli scored the second goal of the game in a 2–0 win over Sweden in the quarter-finals of the competition, as England reached the semi-finals for the first time in 28 years. Alli played for England in the semi-final match against Croatia, winning a free-kick through which England took the lead, though they eventually lost 2–1 following extra-time.

In October 2019, he was left out of the England squad for forthcoming Euro 2020 qualifying matches.

Player profile

Style of play
Early in his career, Alli was widely considered one of the best young midfielders of his generation, and won PFA Young Player of the Year two years running. He was praised for his all-round skillset and his goalscoring prowess, particularly when playing as a second striker. Alli's manager at the time, Mauricio Pochettino, said in 2017: "In the box, he looks like a striker, and outside the box, he plays like a midfielder." Rafael van der Vaart said of Alli that he is "fast, fluid and has a great skill set", while Frank Lampard praised Alli's intelligence in his ability "to get into the box without being marked". However, Alli's form faded in 2018, resulting in him losing his place in the England team in 2019.

Alli has been widely accused of diving and has received bookings for simulation.

Reception
In 2018, Alli was considered the world's most expensive midfielder from a transfer value perspective by the CIES.

Personal life
Alli was born in Milton Keynes, Buckinghamshire, to a Yoruba Nigerian father Kehinde and English mother Denise. Kehinde moved to the United States a week after Alli's birth. Alli was initially brought up by his mother, who suffered from alcohol problems. At the age of nine, he moved to Nigeria with his father, where he spent two years in an international school before returning to Milton Keynes to live with his mother. Alli went to Stantonbury Campus and The Radcliffe School in Wolverton.

At the age of 13, he moved into the family home of Alan and Sally Hickford, parents of another young footballer with MK Dons and whom he refers to as his "adoptive parents" although he was never legally adopted by them. In the summer of 2016, Alli elected to stop wearing his surname on his match shirts because he felt no connection with the Alli family name, instead opting for "Dele".

Alli was a Liverpool fan growing up with Steven Gerrard his childhood idol, and saw Gerrard and Frank Lampard as good role models on how they act as professionals. He is also a fan of British hip hop music, which led rapper Cadet to release a single referencing the footballer, "Advice".

On 13 May 2020, Alli was held at knifepoint during a burglary by two men who broke into his house in north London. He was punched and suffered minor facial injuries. The burglars stole jewellery including watches.

Career statistics

Club

International

As of match played 9 June 2019. England score listed first, score column indicates score after each Alli goal.

Honours
Milton Keynes Dons
Football League One runner-up: 2014–15

Tottenham Hotspur
EFL Cup runner-up: 2020–21
UEFA Champions League runner-up: 2018–19

England
UEFA Nations League third place: 2018–19

Individual
Milton Keynes Dons Young Player of the Year: 2013–14
Football League Young Player of the Month: August 2014
Football League One Player of the Month: January 2015
Football League Young Player of the Year: 2014–15
Milton Keynes Dons Player's Player of the Year: 2014–15
BBC Goal of the Season: 2015–16
PFA Young Player of the Year: 2015–16, 2016–17
Premier League Player of the Month: January 2017
PFA Team of the Year: 2014–15 League One, 2015–16 Premier League, 2016–17 Premier League

References

External links

Profile at the Tottenham Hotspur F.C. website
Profile at the Football Association website

1996 births
Living people
People from Milton Keynes
Footballers from Buckinghamshire
English footballers
England youth international footballers
England under-21 international footballers
England international footballers
Association football midfielders
Milton Keynes Dons F.C. players
Tottenham Hotspur F.C. players
Everton F.C. players
Beşiktaş J.K. footballers
English Football League players
Premier League players
Süper Lig players
UEFA Euro 2016 players
2018 FIFA World Cup players
English expatriate footballers
English expatriate sportspeople in Turkey
Expatriate footballers in Turkey
Black British sportsmen
English people of Nigerian descent
English people of Yoruba descent
Yoruba sportspeople
English victims of crime